Brenda Clark (born February 10, 1955) is a Canadian illustrator, perhaps best known for her work on the Franklin the Turtle series of children's books.

She was born in Toronto and studied illustration at Sheridan College. She now lives in Port Hope.

Several books in the Franklin series have received awards from the Canadian Children's Book Centre. An animated television series Franklin based on the Franklin the Turtle books appeared on Canadian and American television. Canada Post issued a stamp featuring Franklin the Turtle in 2012. A second television series Franklin and Friends appeared in more than fifteen countries.

Clark was named to the Order of Canada in 2014.

Selected work 
 Sadie and the Snowman (1985) text by Allen Morgan
 Franklin in the Dark (1986) text by Paulette Bourgeois
 Little Fingerling (1989) text by Monica Hughes, received a book award from the Toronto chapter of the Imperial Order Daughters of the Empire
 My Dog: A Scrapbook of Drawings, Photos and Facts (1993) text by Marilyn Baillie
 Puddleman (1994), text by Ted Staunton

References

External links 

 

1955 births
Living people
Artists from Toronto
Canadian children's book illustrators
Sheridan College alumni
Members of the Order of Canada
Franklin the Turtle (books)